Anchor Lake is a lake in St. Louis County, in the U.S. state of Minnesota. It is approximately 2 miles north of Central Lakes alongside U.S. Route 53. The 216-acre Anchor Lake Wildlife Management Area is located along the southern and eastern shores of the lake.

Anchor Lake was so named on account of its outline being shaped like an anchor.

See also
List of lakes in Minnesota

References

Lakes of Minnesota
Lakes of St. Louis County, Minnesota